Yvette King (born 23 October 1983) is a Korean-Australian entertainment journalist who is best known as host of E! News Asia and anchor of Fox Sports News (Asia).

Early life
After graduating from The University of Sydney with a degree in journalism, King got her first reporter role as a video journalist for The Daily Telegraph.

Career

Television
In 2013, King joined Fox International Channels, hosting Football Crazy and anchoring Fox Sports Central Asia and Fox Sports News.

In 2015, King joined E! News Asia.

Interviewees include David Beckham, Victoria Beckham, Eva Longoria, Chris Hemsworth, Charlize Theron, Jessica Chastain, Patricia Field, Kevin Hart and Naomi Campbell.

References

External links

 Official Website
 Instagram

Living people
Australian people of South Korean descent
Australian fashion journalists
Entertainment journalists
1983 births
University of Sydney alumni